Honey I'm Home may refer to:

 "Honey, I'm Home", a 1998 song by Shania Twain
 Honey I'm Home (album), a 2009 album by Al B. Sure!